This is a list of Nigerian region governors and premiers in the First Republic (1960 - 1966). 
Nigeria became independent on 1 October 1960 and became a republic on 1 October 1963. 
On 16 January 1966 a military coup brought Major General Johnson Aguiyi-Ironsi  to power, terminating the first period of democratic rule.
During this period an appointed governor was nominal head of state while an elected premier led the government.

See also
List of Nigerian Region Military Governors (1966–1967)
List of state governors of Nigeria

References

1961
Politics of Nigeria